Major General Leo Martin Boyle (July 20, 1899 – May 3, 1969) was a senior United States Army and Illinois National Guard officer. He served as one of the longest adjutants general of Illinois, serving continuously from 1940 until three months prior to his death in 1969.

As the adjutant general, he was responsible for leading and coordinating the use of the Illinois National Guard in both territorial and federal matters.

Career
Born in Chicago, Boyle first enlisted in the US Army and Illinois National Guard in 1916 at the age of seventeen, taking part in the Pancho Villa Expedition. From there he went on to serve with distinction in World War I, earning a Silver Star for gallantry.

In October 1924 he earned a commission as a second lieutenant in the 65th Infantry Brigade. He rose steadily through the ranks until he was appointed as assistant adjutant of the 33rd Division. It was in this position that as a captain he served with General George Marshall, who was assigned to the Illinois National Guard from 1933 until 1936 as the division's senior instructor.

Immediately prior to the outbreak of World War II, Boyle was appointed as the adjutant general of Illinois on 8 November 1940 and promoted to brigadier general by Illinois governor John Henry Stelle. He was further promoted to major general in 1945, becoming federally recognized in 1952. This federal recognition was withdrawn in July 1963 upon Boyle reaching the mandatory retirement age of 62; however, he continued to receive federal support for his role as adjutant general, attending several professional military courses well after his federal recognition was withdrawn. Boyle served in the role of adjutant general as a major general in the Illinois National Guard until his death in July 1969 of lung cancer and emphysema, conditions which he attributed to his wartime experiences in World War I.

Boyle was involved in a lawsuit over the controversial dismissal of another Illinois National Guard general, Major General Joseph Teece in 1951. He further provoked the ire of the active-duty Army when he directed the Illinois National Guard to begin training to respond to civil disturbances in addition to military training. He would later be exonerated in his beliefs when the Illinois National Guard was called up to quell the riots during the 1968 Democratic Convention.

Major General Boyle was one of only six generals in the history of the United States Army to have served as a general during three major conflicts, serving stateside during World War II as a brigadier general, and then stateside again during Korea and Vietnam as a major general. The other five were Brevet Lieutenant General Winfield Scott (War of 1812, Mexican War and Civil War), General of the Army Douglas MacArthur (World War I, World War II and Korea), Lieutenant General Milton Reckord (World War II, Korea, Vietnam), General Lewis Blaine Hershey (World War II, Korea, Vietnam), and General Hugh Shelton (Panama, Gulf War, War on Terror). His twenty-nine years of service as the commander of the Illinois National Guard is the longest tenure of any Illinois Adjutants General.

Dates of rank

References

1899 births
1969 deaths
Military personnel from Chicago
United States Army personnel of World War I
United States Army generals
Adjutants General of Illinois
United States Army generals of World War II
United States Army personnel of the Korean War
United States Army personnel of the Vietnam War
Deaths from lung cancer
Deaths from emphysema